Rabbi Menachem Mendel Futerfas (22 September 1907 – 2 July 1995) known informally as Reb Mendel, was a famous Chabad Mashpia and Chossid. He was a top student of the famed Mashpia, Reb Zalman Moishe HaYitzchaki.

Activities

Futerfas operated clandestine Jewish Cheders in the USSR, for which he was incarcerated for 14 years in Siberian gulags.

After leaving Russia, the Lubavitcher Rebbe, Menachem Mendel Schneerson, instructed him to serve as Mashpia in the Yeshiva of Tomchei Temimim in Kfar Chabad, in Israel. He arrived there in the summer of 1973 where his farbrengens were famous.

He died on July 2, 1995, and is buried in London.

Teachings 
He was known for telling stories, particularly from his incarceration, and deriving lessons from everything he heard and saw there. He once told that although playing cards was against prison rules, his prison-mates would always play in their cell. The prison guard could see them playing; however, when he came in, the cards would be gone. As hard as he would search, the guard could not find the illicit items. When he finally gave up and promised not to bother the prisoners if they would only tell him what they did with the cards, they told him that every time he came in, they would slip the cards into his own pocket and then pick-pocket the cards back before he left. Futerfas learned from this that sometimes we go looking far and long, when we have what we want in our own pocket.

Notable students
 Herman Branover

References

Chabad-Lubavitch Mashpiim
1907 births
1995 deaths
Hasidic rabbis in Israel